Samuel Morgan Slom (born April 13, 1942) is an American politician and a former member of the Hawaii Senate, where he represented the 9th District (which included Hawaii Kai, Aina Haina, Kahala and Diamond Head on the island of Oahu) from 1996 to 2016. Between 2010 and 2016, Slom was the sole Republican member of the Hawaii Senate. He is a native of Allentown, Pennsylvania.

Career
Slom formerly served as chief economist for the Bank of Hawaii.
From 1983 until 2014, Slom served as the president and executive director of Smart Business Hawaii, a chamber of commerce that said it was more small business-oriented than the Chamber of Commerce of Hawaii.

In 1996, Slom challenged incumbent Democrat Donna R. Ikeda to represent the 8th district in the Senate of Hawaii. Slom won the election, defeating Ikeda, 12,191 votes to 7,312. The Honolulu Star-Bulletin called the election a "huge election night upset".

Following the retirement of Senator Fred Hemmings, Slom became the sole Republican in the 25-member Senate between 2010 and 2017. Slom served on all sixteen Senate standing committees. He had to depend on a Democratic colleague to second every motion that he made on the Senate floor (otherwise, the motion dies for lack of a second). Lynn Finnegan, an outgoing Republican member of the Hawaii House of Representatives who ran unsuccessfully for Lieutenant Governor of Hawaii, described Slom's challenge as communicating with Republican constituents across the state who will pressure Democratic lawmakers to consider alternative proposals on some issues.

Former Honolulu City Councilman Stanley Chang defeated Slom in the 2016 elections, which made the Senate of Hawaii the only legislative chamber in the United States with a single party holding all seats. Slom received 47% of the vote.

Early life and education
Slom was raised in a Reform Jewish family and received an LL.B from La Salle Law School in 1966 and a BA in Government/Economics from the University of Hawaii in 1963.

Political experience and activities
Slom held the following positions in the Hawaii State Senate:
Senate Minority Leader, Hawaii State Senate, 2010–2017
Minority Floor Leader, Hawaii State Senate, 1996–2017
Vice Chairman, Senate Committee for Economic Development and Technology

Former legislative committees and subcommittees
Slom was a member of the following committees:
Agriculture, Member
Commerce and Consumer Protection, Member
Economic Development and Technology, Vice Chair
Education, Member
Energy and Environment, Member
Hawaiian Affairs, Member
Health, Member
Higher Education, Member
Human Services, Member
Judiciary and Labor, Member
Public Safety and Military Affairs, Member
Technology and the Arts, Member
Tourism and Government Operations, Member
Transportation and International Affairs, Member
Water and Land, Member
Ways and Means, Member

Slom was a member of the following subcommittee:
Joint House and Senate Committee for Hawaii Health Connector Oversight, Member

References

External links

Hawaii Senate Minority official website (archived from 2016)
 Hawaii State Legislature - Senator Sam Slom official government site (archived from 2015)

1942 births
21st-century American Jews
21st-century American politicians
Republican Party Hawaii state senators
Hawaii lawyers
Jewish American state legislators in Hawaii
Living people
Politicians from Allentown, Pennsylvania